Deana Haggag (born 1987) is an American arts organization leader. She is the program officer in arts and culture at Andrew W. Mellon Foundation. Formally, Haggag was the President and CEO of United States Artists (2017–2020), and was Executive Director of The Contemporary (2013–2017) in Baltimore, Maryland.

Early life and education
Haggag was born in Brooklyn, New York in 1987, to parents that were Muslim Egyptian immigrants. She is Muslim and first-generation Egyptian-American. Haggag grew up in Rutherford, New Jersey.

In 2009, Haggag received a Bachelor of Arts from Rutgers University–Newark, where she majored in Art History and Philosophy. In 2013, Haggag earned a Master of Fine Arts at the Maryland Institute College of Art in Baltimore, Maryland, where she majored in Curatorial Practice.

Career
From 2017 until May 2020, Haggag served as the President and CEO of United States Artists in Chicago, which provides US$50,000 "fellowships to artists working in architecture and design, crafts, dance, literature, media, music, theater and performance, traditional arts, and visual arts." She had formerly been Executive Director of The Contemporary from 2013 until 2017.

At The Contemporary, Haggag was credited for reviving the museum (formerly "The Contemporary Museum") and turning it into one of the most vital cultural institutions in Baltimore. At age 26, she became Executive Director and sole employee, relaunching the organization following its closure for approximately 18-months. During her tenure, the museum's staff grew to five employees and its budget increased from US$40,000 to over US$500,000. Additionally, under her leadership, The Contemporary commissioned four-award-winning large-scale art projects, including "Bubble Over Green" by Victoria Fu; "Ghost Food" by Miriam Simun; "Only When It's Dark Enough Can You See The Stars" by Abigail DeVille; and "The Ground" by Michael Jones McKean. The museum also created a number of artist resources to bolster the cultural community in the region.

Haggag's work has been praised in Vogue, Cultured Magazine, Artspace, Hyperallergic among other publications. At Vogue, Rebecca Bengal praised Haggag's role in national efforts to protect arts funding:

Haggag was named Artistic Director of the 2020 Seattle Art Fair, founded by Paul Allen in Seattle, WA, before it was cancelled due to the Covid-19 pandemic.

References

External links
 
 Oral history interview with Deana Haggag, 2020 August 14, Archives of American Art, Smithsonian Institution

1987 births
Living people
American art curators
American women curators
African-American Muslims
American women chief executives
American people of Egyptian descent
African-American curators
People from Brooklyn
People from Baltimore
People from Rutherford, New Jersey
Rutgers University alumni
Maryland Institute College of Art alumni
21st-century African-American people
21st-century African-American women
20th-century African-American people
20th-century African-American women